The Texas Memorial Museum, located on the campus of the University of Texas at Austin in Austin, Texas, USA, was created during preparations for the Texas Centennial Exposition held in 1936. The museum's focus is on natural history, including paleontology, geology, biology, herpetology, ichthyology and entomology. At one point, the museum also had exhibits on Texas history, anthropology, geography, and ethnography, but these were relocated to other museums (including the Bullock Texas State History Museum) in 2001.

The building was designed in the Art Deco style by John F. Staub, with Paul Cret as supervising architect. Ground was broken for the building by President Franklin D. Roosevelt in January 1936. The museum was opened on January 15, 1939.

The museum won "Best of Austin" awards from the Austin Chronicle in 2002, 2005, and 2012.

In October 2013, Linda Hicke, the dean of Austin's College of Natural Sciences, cut the museum's funding by $400,000 and transferred ownership to the American Legion Texas Branch. The staff was reduced from twelve employees to three: a security guard, a gift shop operator and one other employee.

Wichita County Meteorite

In 1723, the Comanche defeated the Lipan Apache people in a nine-day battle along the Rio del Fierro (Wichita River). The River of Iron may be the location written about by Athanase De Mezieres in 1772, containing "a mass of metal which the Indians say is hard, thick, heavy, and composed of iron", which they "venerate...as an extraordinary manifestation of nature", the Comanche's calling it "Ta-pic-ta-carre [standing rock], Po-i-wisht-carre [standing metal], or Po-a-cat-le-pi-le-carre [medicine rock]", the general area containing a "large number of meteoric masses".

The Wichita County meteorite originally weighed 145 kg and was obtained by Major Robert Neighbors, US Indian agent at Fort Belknap, in 1858-1859, who presented it to the State Cabinet, and was displayed in the old Capitol building before it burned down, when this Coarse Octahedrite was turned over to the University of Texas.  According to Neighbors, "When the meteorite was conveyed to the Indian reserve, the Comanches collected in great numbers around their valued medicine stone and, whilst manifesting their attachment by rubbing their arms, hands, and chests over it, earnestly besought Major Neighbors to permit them to keep it at the agency."

A sister meteorite weighing 742 kg, the Red River meteorite, was discovered in 1808 but this Medium Octahedrite now resides in the Yale Peabody Museum of Natural History.

References

Bibliography

External links

Official website of the TMM
Red River Meteorite

Museums in Austin, Texas
Natural history museums in Texas
University of Texas at Austin
University museums in Texas
Paul Philippe Cret buildings
University of Texas at Austin campus
Paleontology in Texas
Museums established in 1939
1939 establishments in Texas
University and college buildings completed in 1939